Lake Amvrakia or Ambracia is a freshwater lake in Aetolia-Acarnania, in western Greece. It is a Natura 2000 protected habitat.

Origin
Lake Amvrakia was a result of tectonic movement. It is karstic and semipolje type. The lake formed from deposits of Mesozoic limestone.

Location and Geology
Lake Amvrakia lies along a depression northwest of Lake Ozeros and west of Mount Thyamos or Petalas. Its total surface area used to be 13.6 km2, but that area has shrunk drastically in recent years. One of the reasons for this reduction in size was a long drought and the other was the draining of the shallow northern section of the basin, which is currently cut off by an embankment created for the national highway. This drainage had a severe impact on the lake's size, owing to the small size of the basin (112 km2.).

Important species
Pseudobithynia ambrakis, a species of bithynidae (snails) that has only been found in lake Amvrakia.

Threats
Hydraulic activity with the karstic aquifers, evaporation during summer, and use of water for irrigation result in fluctuating water levels with each passing year. The lake is unique from other nearby lakes in its high sulphuric anions concentration. The lake's waters are polluted, although not alarmingly, by the runoff from the tobacco plantations lying to eastern and southern regions of the drainage basin. The lake's east coast is cultivated heavily, the fields reaching almost to the shore. The uncultivated areas on the lake's shore are used as pastures for cattle.

References

Amvrakia
Landforms of Aetolia-Acarnania
Natura 2000 in Greece
Landforms of Western Greece